Septemvri is a Bulgarian professional association football club based in Sofia, which currently competes in the First League, the first tier of Bulgarian football. Its home ground is the Septemvri Stadium, but due to its poor condition the team plays its home matches at the Vasil Levski National Stadium and 57th Public School's FIFA-certified football field.

The club's biggest success to date is the winning of the Bulgarian Cup in 1960 and finishing 5th in the Bulgarian first division during the same season. Septemvri is known for its strong youth academy, which over the years has developed numerous players for Bulgaria's elite clubs and the national team.

History

Early ages
On November 5, 1944 the clubs Sportclub Sofia, Sokol and Vazrazhdane unite under the name of FC Septemvri Sofia; the name derives from the revolution of September 1944. On March 26, 1945, the additional clubs of Botev (Konyovitsa), Ustrem (Zaharna fabrika), Pobeda (Krasna Polyana), and Svoboda (Tri kladentsi) merge into the club. In May 1948, the club, then playing in the 1st Sofia Division, is briefly merged with second-division CDV/Chavdar (Sofia) and the unified club wins the 1948 Bulgarian Championship by overcoming Levski Sofia in the final.

Septemvri starts the 1948–49 season in the newly formed A Republican Football Group, but only six months later is separated from CDV (Chavdar) and removed from the division, with the current title given to CDNV, Chavdar's new name, which would ultimately become CSKA Sofia. At the end of the 1948–49 season, Septemvri is allowed to take part in a two-match play-off for entering first division against Marek Dupnitsa. After both matches end with a 2:0 win for each team, a third game is played in which Septemvri falls 1:0 and remains in second division.

From 1949 to 1969, Septemvri exists as an independent club, during which period it reaches the height of its success. In 1959, the club finishes first in the B PFG and is promoted to first division for the 1959–60 season. That same season, Septemvri finishes in 5th place and claims the Bulgarian Cup after a dramatic 4:3 win over Lokomotiv Sofia in extra time. The club's stay among the elite lasts only two years, as in 1961 it is relegated to the B PFG, where it remains until 1968.

In 1969, during another period of football reform in Bulgaria, Septemvri was again merged into CSKA Sofia. This unification continued for almost 20 years, until 1988, when the club became independent again and joined the V AFG. In 1993, Septemvri won a promotion to the B PFG. In 1998, the club became the champion of the B PFG and joined the elite for the first time since 1961. It finished in 16th place and was relegated again.

2000s
During the 2000–01 season, the club finished in 13th place in the B PFG and was relegated to the V AFG, where it remained until 2008. In March 2008, the club was heavily penalized after a scandalous match against FC Bansko, when coach Rumen Stoyanov ordered his players to leave the field, a serious offence according to Bulgarian Football Union regulations. With an executive decision, the BFU removed Septemvri from the V AFG and placed it in the A OFG, the Sofia Regional Football Group. Despite this setback, the club attained 1st place in the division in the 2008–09 season and qualified for a play-off match for entering the V AFG against FC Novi Iskar. After an emotional 0–0 in regular time, penalty kicks were in order to determine the team going forward. Septemvri lost the penalty shootout 5–4.

Chandarov era (2015–present)

Merge with DIT academy and Pirin Razlog (2015–2017)
In 2015, Rumen Chandarov, owner of DIT Sport Academy, one of the best Bulgarian football academies in the last few years, announced that he is the new owner of Septemvri, with the goal of getting the young players to compete in the First Professional Football League of Bulgaria. The team merged with Conegliano German and started the 2015–16 season from V Group. Nikolay Mitov was appointed as a manager of the team. In the end of the 2015 it was decided that the team will give a bigger chance to their U19 players, so most of the players who joined in the season start left and only seven players left, but 18 players joined from the U19 team which was third in the Elite Youth Group by the end of 2015. Some media announced that Chandarov will stop financing the team also due to the fact that he started financing Botev Plovdiv, but Chandarov said that this is not true and the only reason to do this is to make youth players enter the men's football.

On 24 June 2016, Pirin Razlog merged into PFC Septemvri Sofia. From the new season 2016–17 Septemvri will compete in the new Second League, the second division of Bulgarian football. Septemvri returned and in the Bulgarian Cup and draw the Bulgarian First League team Beroe Stara Zagora. They won the match on 21 September 2016 with 2–0, goals scored by Georgi Stoichkov and Petar Tonchev. The team finished their season in Second League in 2nd place two points behind the winners of the group — Etar and qualified for the Promotion playoffs against elite member Montana. The team won the playoff on 3 June 2017 with 2–1 final result and returned to the top level after 19 years.

Return to Professional leagues (2017–present)
On 8 June 2017, Dimitar Vasev was announced as the manager who would lead the team in their return to the First League with Hristo Arangelov, the caretaker manager after Nikolay Mitov, as his first assistant. The team announced that they would play to Vasil Levski National Stadium until their Septemvri Stadium is built. Later, the club owner Rumen Chandarov revealed that the team would play at Bistritsa Stadium after the stadium gained a First League licence, since he didn't want Septemvri to play in front of empty seats. Septemvri's first match was against Dunav Ruse on 17 July and the team lost the match 0–2. Week later Septemvri won their second match against Pirin with Boris Galchev scoring the winning goal. After four defeats in five games, Vasev was released and Nikolay Mitov returned in charge after his release from Levski Sofia. Septemvri finished the half season in 10th place with 23 points after a 2–1 win over Cherno More.

On 20 February 2018, Septemvri's executive director Georgi Markov died aged 46, three years after he suffered a heart attack.

Septemvri secured their place in First League on 15 April 2018 after a 0–2 win over Dunav Ruse and qualified for European play-off quarter-finals.

Septemvri could not avoid relegation in the next season, however, as they were relegated after losing in the relegation playoffs to FC Arda Kardzhali , 0-1. This ended their two year stay in the Bulgarian elite.

Back in the second tier after two seasons in the elite, Septemvri managed to maintain their good form and remained largely within the top three in the Second League, a strong candidate for promotion. The 2019-20 season was eventually not finished, due to the COVID-19 outbreak in Bulgaria. The last matches were played in early March. At that time, Septemvri was second in the league, three points behind CSKA 1948. Septemvri  faced the 13th placed team from the First League in a promotion playoff, but lost. On 5 May 2022, after a great second half of season 2021-22, Septemvri secured their return to First League. This achievement was accomplished under the management of Slavko Matić.

Seasons

Season by season

Seasons in A Group (now First League): 7
Seasons in B Group (now Second League): 28
Seasons in V Group: 14
Seasons in A Regional Group: 6
Seasons in I Sofia Division: 4

Last 5 seasons

League positions

Honours

Domestic
First League:
 5th place (1): 1959–60
Second League: 
  Winners (4): 1955−56, 1958−59, 1997−98, 2021-22
Third League: 
  Winners (1): 1992−93
A Regional Group: 
  Winners (5): 1952, 1989–90, 1990–91, 2008–09, 2009–10
Bulgarian Cup:
  Winners (1): 1959–60

Crest, Shirt and Kit manufacturer

Crest history

Kits and manufacturers
From 1944 to 1990 team main color is red with white or blue. From 1990 to 2010 team main color is purple, but in the period between 2001 and 2007 they used white with red colors. From 2011 team first kit is dark red.

Players

Current squad
As of 6 March 2023

For recent transfers, see Transfers summer 2022 and Transfers winter 2022–23.

Out on loan

Foreign players
Up to one non-EU national can be registered and given a squad number for the first team in the Second League. Those non-EU nationals with European ancestry can claim citizenship from the nation their ancestors came from. If a player does not have European ancestry he can claim Bulgarian citizenship after playing in Bulgaria for 5 years. 

EU Nationals
 Petar Čuić
  Sebastian Jakubiak

EU Nationals (Dual citizenship)

Non-EU Nationals
 Stefan Milić
 Martin Stojanov
 Vlatko Stojanovski
 Konstantin Cheshmedjiev

Notable players
Had international caps for their respective countries, or held any club record. Players whose name is listed in bold represented their countries while playing for Septemvri.

Bulgaria
 Manol Manolov
 Gavril Stoyanov
 Dimitar Milanov
 Dimitar Largov
 Dimitar Yakimov
 Aleksandar Vasilev
 Atanas Gerov
 Asparuh Nikodimov
 Pavel Panov
 Dimitar Yordanov
 Bozhidar Iskrenov
 Plamen Nikolov
 Krasimir Koev
 Marius Urukov
 Vladimir Yonkov
 Radoslav Vasilev
 Boris Galchev
 Valeri Bojinov

Europe
 Darko Glišić
 Suad Sahiti

Africa
 Simba Marumo
 Alassane Diaby

Appearance records

Players in bold are still playing for Septemvri.

Club officials

Board of directors

Current technical body

Manager history

References

External links
  
 Fans website  
 Septemvri at bgclubs.eu
 Septemvri at UEFA.com
 DIT Academy Official website

Football clubs in Sofia
Association football clubs established in 1944
1944 establishments in Bulgaria